In Lee's Last Retreat: The Flight to Appomattox, historian William Marvel identified Private Pleasant Riggs Crump, of Talladega County, Alabama, who died December 31, 1951, as the last confirmed surviving veteran of the Confederate States Army. Citing English professor and biographical researcher Dr. Jay S. Hoar, Marvel states that after Crump's death a dozen other men claimed to have been Confederate soldiers, but military, pension, and especially census records prove they were impostors. Marvel further wrote that the names of two other supposed Confederate survivors alive in April 1950, according to Hoar, are not on the Appomattox parole lists and one, perhaps both, of their Confederate service claims were faked. An extensively researched book by Frank L. Gryzb, The Last Civil War Veterans: The Lives of the Final Survivors State by State, published March 29, 2016, supports the conclusion by Hoar, Marvel, Serrano and others that Pleasant Crump was the last confirmed and verified surviving veteran of the Confederate States Army.

Following the entry in the table below for Pleasant Crump is a list of the discredited or unproven Confederate veteran claimants who died after Crump's death.

Table of last survivors 

On December 19, 1959, Walter Washington Williams (sometimes referred to as Walter G. Williams), reputed near the time of his death to be the last surviving veteran of the Confederate States Army, died in Houston, Texas. Williams's status as the last Confederate veteran already had been debunked by a September 3, 1959 story in the New York Times by Lloyd K. Bridwell. In his 1991 article in Blue and Gray magazine entitled The Great Imposters, William Marvel gave further details, including census records from before his 1932 Confederate pension application, showing Williams's birth as having occurred between October 1854 and April 1855 in Itawamba County, Mississippi. Those records showed he was too young to have served in the Confederate Army. Also, he did not identify himself as a Confederate veteran in the 1910 census which included a question about whether a person had that status. Nonetheless, since all the other claimants were dead, Williams was celebrated as the last Confederate veteran after his death on December 19, 1959.

When Williams's status was disproved, attention turned to the alleged second longest surviving Confederate veteran, John B. Salling of Slant in Scott County, Virginia. Marvel also showed that Salling had been too young to have served in the Confederate Army. In a post on the Library of Virginia blog on October 6, 2010, Craig Moore, Virginia State Records Appraisal Archivist, wrote that when Salling applied for a pension in 1933, Pension Clerk John H. Johnson could not find a war record for Salling at the Library of Virginia, which held the records of the Department of Confederate Military Records. Salling received a pension after providing a notarized statement attesting to his service. Moore wrote that Marvel had found census records which put Salling's birth date in 1858. After stating Marvel's finding, Moore concluded that although existing Confederate pension records do not confirm or deny Salling's claim, the Commonwealth of Virginia accepted his claimed status.

In the Blue & Gray article, Marvel wrote, "Every one of the last dozen recognized Confederates was bogus. Thomas Riddle was only five when the Confederacy collapsed, and Arnold Murray only nine. William Loudermilk, who insisted he fought through the Atlanta Campaign at 16, did not turn 14 until after Appomattox. William Bush and a reputed Confederate nurse named Sarah Rockwell were not 20 years old in the summer of 1865, but 15."

The motive for fabrications of Confederate Army service almost always was to support a claim for a veteran's pension during the hard times of the Great Depression.

In his 1991 article in Blue & Gray magazine, Marvel confirmed Albert Woolson's (February 11, 1850 – August 2, 1956) claim to be the last surviving Union Army veteran and asserted that Woolson was the last genuine surviving American Civil War veteran from either side. On October 10, 1864, Albert enlisted in Company C, 1st Minnesota Heavy Artillery Regiment, becoming the company's drummer. However, the company never saw action, and Albert Woolson was discharged on September 7, 1865. Union Army veteran James Albert Hard (July 15, 1843 – March 12, 1953) was the last verified surviving American Civil War veteran who was in combat.

Notes

References 
 Associated Press. 'Civil War Veteran's Claim Disputed', published in Spokane Daily Chronicle, September 2, 1959. Retrieved September 28, 2014.
 Associated Press. 'Reputed Last Civil War Veteran Dies in Texas After Long Illness: Walter Williams Put His Age at 117 – Tributes Note the End of an Era'. The New York Times. December 20, 1959. Retrieved November 7, 2010.
 Bridwell, Lloyd K. Texan's Civil War Role in Doubt As Records Indicate Age Is 104, New York Times, September 3, 1959.
 Carroll, H. Bailey. Texas Collection, in Texas State Historical Association, 'The Southwestern Historical Quarterly' Vol. 63, No. 4, Apr., 1960, p. 602. Retrieved September 29, 2014. 
 'The Civil War Monitor'. Retrieved October 2, 2014.
 Compiled Service Records of Confederate Soldiers Who Served in Organizations from the State of Alabama, M-311, RG 109.
 Gryzb, Frank, The Last Civil War Veterans: The Lives of the Final Survivors State by State. Jefferson, NC: McFarland & Company, Inc., 2016. .
 Hoar, Jay S. The South's Last Boys in Gray. Bowling Green, Ohio: Bowling Green State University Popular Press, 1986. . pp. 463–516.
 Marvel, William (1991). The Great Impostors. Blue and Gray Magazine, Vol VIII, Issue 3. pp. 32–33.
 Marvel, William. Lee's Last Retreat: The Flight to Appomattox . Chapel Hill, NC: University of North Carolina Press, 2002. . p. 198.
 Marvel, William. A Place Called Appomattox, Chapel Hill, NC: University of North Carolina Press, 2000, page 264, .
 Moore, Craig, Virginia State Records Appraisal Archivist. Virginia Memory, Library of Virginia, The UncommonWealth ""General" John Salling: Virginia’s Last Confederate Veteran?" October 6, 2010. Retrieved December 2, 2020.
 Randle, Kevin. FAKERS! "A Different Perspective", A Commentary on UFOs Paranormal Events and Related Topics.September 8, 2007. Retrieved August 31, 2014.
 Serrano, Richard A. Last of the Blue and Gray: Old Men, Stolen Glory, and the Mystery that Outlived the Civil War. Washington, DC: Smithsonian Books, 2013. .

Confederate veterans
Confederate veterans
Confederate veterans
Civil War, Confederate veterans
Veterans
Confederate
Confederate veterans
Confederate